The Bad River (Lakota: wakpá-šiča; "river-bad") is a tributary of the Missouri River, approximately  long, in central South Dakota in the United States.
The river is formed at Philip, South Dakota, by the confluence of its North and South forks. The main stem of the Bad River flows east-northeast from Philip, passing Midland and Capa. It joins the Missouri at Fort Pierre.

The river basin is noted for deposits of manganese and fuller's earth. At the river mouth near Fort Pierre, the Bad River flood stage contains large quantities of silt. The Bad carries hard water of generally poor quality.

The name recalls an incident around the spring of 1738 when a flash flood on the Bad River inundated the camp of a north-traveling band, causing a large loss of life, including all their horses. The Bad River was called the Teton River by Lewis & Clark in 1804 as the place where they parlayed with Teton Lakota, but the name did not catch. 

Industrial use
As of November 2019, TC Energy was applying for permits in the state to tap the Bad River to use water for the construction of Phase 4 of the Keystone pipeline, including camp construction to house transient construction workers.

See also
List of rivers of South Dakota

References

Rivers of South Dakota
Tributaries of the Missouri River
Rivers of Haakon County, South Dakota
Rivers of Pennington County, South Dakota
Rivers of Jackson County, South Dakota
Rivers of Stanley County, South Dakota